Kalateh-ye Sadat-e Bala (also Romanized as Kalāteh-ye Sādāt-e Bālā; also known as Kalāteh-ye Sādāt Mehr and Kalāteh-ye Sādāt) is a village in Mehr Rural District, Bashtin District, Davarzan County, Razavi Khorasan Province, Iran. At the 2006 census, its population was 143, in 49 families.

References 

Populated places in Davarzan County